The National Assembly of the Socialist Left was an alliance of far-left groups in Mexico. The only assembly of the socialist left for the creation of a "Socialist Front" was held in Mexico City April 16–17, 2005. The appeal inviting to the meeting was signed by:
 Socialist Alliance (Alianza Socialista)
 Encuentro Nacional de las Izquierdas
 New September 23 Movement (Nuevo Movimiento 23 de Septiembre, formerly Colectivo de exmillitantes del Movimiento Armado Socialista)
 Socialist Collective (Colectivo Socialista)
 Socialist Convergence (Convergencia Socialista)
 Marxist Collective of Colima (Colectivo Marxista de Colima)
 Union of Revolutionary Struggle - Collective of Reflection in Action (Unión de Lucha Revolucionaria (ULR)-Colectivo de Reflexión en la Acción)
 New Socialist Movement (Movimiento Socialismo Nuevo)
 Mexican Communist Party (marxist-leninist) (Partido Comunista Mexicano (marxista-leninista))
 Revolutionary Left Network of PRD (Red de Izquierda Revolucionaria del PRD)
 Democratic Convergence "Valentín Campa" (Convergencia Democrática "Valentín Campa")
 Current of Democratic Socialism (Corriente del Socialismo Democrático)
 Youth and Students Front "Ernesto Che Guevara" of REDIR (Frente de Jóvenes y Estudiantes "Ernesto Che Guevara" de REDIR)
 Health Workers Socialist Committee "Dr. Ernesto Che Guevara" (Comité Socialista de Trabajadores de la Salud "Dr. Ernesto Che Guevara")
 For a Different PRD of Sonora (Por un PRD Differente de Sonora)
 Workers League for Socialism (Liga de Trabajadores por el Socialismo)
 Socialist Fraternity Political Cell "Gastón García Cantú" of the Socialist Party of Mexico (Célula Política Fraternidad Socialista "Gastón García Cantú" del Partido Socialista de México)
 Regional Committee for the First Centenary of PSM (Comité Regional Primer Centenario del PSM)
 Popular Socialist Party (Partido Popular Socialista)
 Communist Party of the Valley of Mexico (Partido Comunista del Valle de México)
 Proletarian Political Organisation (Organización Política Proletaria)
 Party of the Communists (Partido de los Comunistas)
 Communist Party of Guerrero (Partido Comunista de Guerrero)
 Promiting Committee of the Unity of the Socialists of Michoacán (Comité Promotor de la Unidad de los Socialistas de Michoacán)
 Sustainable Development in Latin America (Desarrollo Sustentable en América Latina)
 Collective of ex-militants of MRP (Colectivo de exmilitantes del MRP)
 Democratic Broad Front (Frente Amplio Democrático)
 Democratic Movement for Socialism "Ricardo Flores Magón" (Movimiento Democrático por el Socialismo "Ricardo Flores Magón")
 Socialist Unity League (Liga de Unidad Socialista)
 Movimiento Magisterial del Sindicato de Maestros al Servicio del Edo.de México
 Polytechnic National Coordination (Coordinadora Nacional Politécnica)
 Revolutionary Popular Front (Frente Popular Revolucionario)
 Che Guevara Cell (Célula Che Guevara)
 Frente Democrático 23 Sección X SNTE
 Alliance of Social Organisations (Alianza de Organizaciones Sociales (AOS-GAM))
 Barricade Collective of Independent Youth of Ecatepec (Colectivo Barricada de Jóvenes Independientes de Ecatepec)
 CRISOL
 Citizens Dignity (Dignidad Ciudadana)
 Foro Permanente de Comisión de la Verdad
 Citizens Pact (Pacto Ciudadano)
 Citizens Power (Poder Ciudadano)
 Modern Times (Tiempos Modernos)
 UJRM-FPR
 Workers and Socialist Unity (Unidad Obrera y Socialista)
 Communitarian Context (Contexto Comunitario)
 Movement of Popular Struggle (Movimiento de Lucha Popular)
 Socialist Movement of the Northern Frontier (Movimiento Socialista de la Frontera Norte)

2005 establishments in Mexico
Defunct left-wing political party alliances
Defunct political party alliances in Mexico
Far-left politics in Mexico
National Political Associations in Mexico
Political parties established in 2005
Political parties with year of disestablishment missing
Socialist parties in Mexico
Mexico